U.S. Route 129 (US 129) is a north–south United States highway that runs for  in East Tennessee, from the North Carolina state line, near Tapoco, to Knoxville. In Tennessee, the highway is completely overlapped by unsigned (except for mileposts) State Route 115 (SR 115).

Route description

Blount and Monroe Counties

US 129 enters Tennessee and Blount County through Deals Gap, where it twists and turns along a mountain pass running along the Little Tennessee River. This section is known as the Tail of the Dragon (or simply "The Dragon"), popular to driving enthusiasts (of motorcycles and sports cars). It then starts running along the banks of the river, where it has an intersection with the Foothills Parkway before passing by Chilhowee Dam and going through Tallassee. US 129 then briefly enters Monroe County and has an intersection with SR 72. It then re enters Blount County and enters farmland, where it has an intersection with SR 336 in Lanier. US 129 continues northeast through farmland to Clover Hill, where it becomes concurrent with US 411/SR 33. Prior to this point, US 129 is a narrow 2-lane highway known as Calderwood Highway. The then continue north to enter the city of Maryville as a 4-lane undivided highway, where it passes through a business district, where they have an intersection with SR 335 (William Blount Drive), and suburban areas before coming to an interchange, where US 129 separates from US 411/SR 33 (Broadway Avenue) and bypasses downtown on the west side. US 129 becomes an expressway known as US 129 Bypass as it passes by Foothills Mall and has intersections with US 321/SR 73 (Lamar Alexander Boulevard), Foothills Mall Drive (SR 446), and Foch Street before crossing into the neighboring town of Alcoa. US 129 then has an intersection with Louisville Road, which provides access to the neighboring town of Louisville, before crossing some railroad tracks at-grade before coming to an interchange with SR 35 (N Hall Road). US 129 becomes known as Airport Highway and has an interchange with SR 335 (Hunt Road) and 2 interchanges for McGhee Tyson Airport. It then becomes known as Alcoa Highway, a name that it keeps all the way to its northern end. It becomes an at 4-lane divided highway and passes through a major business district before having an intersection with Airbase Road (SR 429) and coming to an interchange with Pellissippi Parkway (I-140, Exit 11 A/B). The stretch between the airport and I-140 is often considered dangerous and even deadly due to the amount of traffic and crashes on the highway. US 129 continues through suburban areas before having an intersection with SR 333 (Topside Road) before leaving Alcoa. It then crosses a bridge over the Little River to enter Knox County.

Knox County

US 129 immediately enters the city limits of Knoxville and has an interchange with SR 168 (Governor John Sevier Highway). It then passes through a business district before going through wooded areas, where it becomes a freeway and has an interchange with Cherokee Trail, where it widens to 6-lanes, and an interchange for Cherokee Farm. US 129 then crosses the Tennessee River via the J. E. Buck Karnes Bridge and runs along the western edge of The University of Tennessee campus and downtown, while having interchanges with US 11/US 70/SR 1/SR 158 (Neyland Drive) and Kingston Pike. US 129 then continues north through industrial areas before coming to an end at an interchange with I-40 (Exit 386 A).

State Route 115 

State Route 115 (SR 115) is the hidden state route that overlaps the entire route of US 129 in the state of Tennessee. The highway is 52.8 miles (85 km) long and is located entirely in East Tennessee. It begins in Blount County and ends in Knox County. It is completely unsigned, with the exception of mileposts, with the highway being solely signed as US 129.

History

The Alcoa Highway portion of US 129 was first constructed and completed as a two-lane roadway from Knoxville to Blount County in 1939 to provide access to the then recently opened McGhee Tyson Airport. US 129's bridge over the Tennessee River in Knoxville was completed in 1935, and was named after James Ernest Karnes (a.k.a. J. E. "Buck" Karnes), a Knoxville recipient of the Medal of Honor. By 1963, Alcoa Highway was widened into a four-lane median-divided facility between I-40 and McGhee Tyson Airport. Several upgrades improving mobility were constructed on the Knoxville-Knox County section of Alcoa Highway, including replacements of at-grade intersections with interchanges at the University of Tennessee Medical Center (UTMC) and John Sevier Highway in the mid-1970s and mid-1980s respectively.

Increasing congestion on Alcoa Highway in Knoxville prompted pushes from residents to form a neighborhood group Make Alcoa a Safe Highway (MASH) in the early 1980s, seeking to address concerns of safety on the highway. In 1986, MASH issued a report with immediate request and short and long-term range plans. Several of the recommendations were established such as a ban of parking on the US 129's right-of-way, speed limit enforcement, and highway lighting. Major planning by the Tennessee Department of Transportation (TDOT) in the 1980s and 1990s recommended median crossing closures, new overpass structures, and the widening into a six-lane facility.

The construction of the Pellissippi Parkway from Oak Ridge to Alcoa required the construction of a cloverleaf interchange at US 129, which was completed in the late 1990s. Around the same time, the City of Knoxville installed lighting along the highway from the Little River north to the UTMC following annexation of the US 129 right-of-way and selected neighboring commercial and residential land-uses. Improvements were made to the US 129 interchange at I-40 and the "Buck" Karnes bridge was replaced with a new six-lane structure by the early 2000s. By 2000, TDOT began property acquisitions for the planned expansions of Alcoa Highway between I-40 and the Little River.

In 2014, TDOT announced plans for improvements to the Alcoa Highway section of US 129 from I-40 to McGhee Tyson Airport in Blount County. The massive project, consisting of seven phases, called for the conversion of Alcoa Highway from a non-access-controlled highway into a full controlled-access highway (freeway). The overall project was given an initial cost of more than $233 million. The first phase of the project to begin was the Maloney Road to Woodson Drive phase in South Knoxville, with contract bidding opening in February 2016.
Construction work on the Maloney to Woodson phase of the Alcoa Highway improvement project began in June of the same year. This section would be mostly complete by the fall of 2021, when new revisions for an access roadway to the Montlake Drive interchange were issued, expecting to be finished in the winter 2022.

Junction list

See also

 Great Smoky Mountains National Park
 Interstate 3
 Little Tennessee River
 Tail of the Dragon
 Tennessee River

References

Tennessee Department of Transportation (24 January 2003). "State Highway and Interstate List 2003".

External links

Tennessee Department of Transportation

129
Transportation in Blount County, Tennessee
Transportation in Monroe County, Tennessee
Transportation in Knox County, Tennessee
 Tennessee
Freeways in Tennessee
Transportation in Knoxville, Tennessee